Miss Vietnam 2014 (Vietnamese: Hoa hậu Việt Nam 2014) was the 14th edition of the Miss Vietnam pageant. It was held on November 22, 2014 at Vinpearl Land, Phú Quốc, Kiên Giang, Vietnam. Miss Vietnam 2012 Đặng Thu Thảo crowned her successor Nguyễn Cao Kỳ Duyên at the end of the event.

Results

Placements
Color keys

Special Awards

Contestants
40 contestants in the final.

References

Beauty pageants in Vietnam
2014 beauty pageants
Vietnamese awards